Biathlon at the 2023 Winter World University Games was held at Whiteface Mountain from 14 to 21 January 2023.

Men's events

Women's events

Mixed events

Medal table

Participating nations
16 nations participated.

  (3)
  (12)
  (8)
  (4)
  (4)
  (2)
  (2)
  (12)
  (1)
  (4)
  (8)
  (4)
  (1)
  (2)
  (8)
  (10)

References

External links
 Biathlon at the 2023 Winter World University Games
 Results book in biathlon

2023 Winter World University Games
 
2023
Winter World University Games